Jürg Martin Fröhlich (born 4 July 1946 in Schaffhausen) is a Swiss mathematician and theoretical physicist. He is best known for introducing rigorous techniques for the analysis of statistical mechanics models, in particular continuous symmetry breaking (infrared bounds), and for pioneering the study of topological phases of matter using low-energy effective field theories.

Biography 
In 1965 Fröhlich began to study mathematics and physics at Eidgenössischen Technischen Hochschule Zürich. In 1969, under Klaus Hepp and Robert Schrader, he attained the Diplom (“Dressing Transformations in Quantum Field Theory”), and in 1972 he earned a PhD from the same institution under Klaus Hepp. After postdoctoral visits to the University of Geneva and Harvard University (with Arthur Jaffe), he took an assistant professorship in 1974 in the mathematics department of Princeton University. From 1978 until 1982 he was a professor at Institut des Hautes Études Scientifiques in Bures-sur-Yvette in Paris, and since 1982 he has been a professor for theoretical physics at ETH, where he founded the Center for Theoretical Studies. 

Over the course of his career, Fröhlich has worked on quantum field theory (including axiomatic quantum field theory, conformal field theory, and topological quantum field theory), on the precise mathematical treatment of models of statistical mechanics, on theories of phase transition, on the fractional quantum Hall effect, and on non-commutative geometry.

Honors and awards 
In 1991 he received with Thomas Spencer the Dannie Heineman prize, in 1997 he received the Marcel Benoist Prize, in 2001 he won the Max Planck Medal of the Deutschen Physikalischen Gesellschaft, and in 2009 he was awarded the Henri Poincaré Prize.  He is a member of the Academia Europaea and the Berlin-Brandenburg Academy of Sciences and Humanities. In 2012 he became a fellow of the American Mathematical Society. In 1978, Fröhlich gave an invited address to the International Congress of Mathematicians in Helsinki (“On the mathematics of phase transitions”) and in 1994 at the plenary talk of the ICM in Zurich (“The FQHE, Chern–Simons Theory and Integral Lattices”). He also co-authored a book on quantum triviality. In 2020, he was elected international member of the National Academy of Sciences.

Selected works

See also 

 Chern–Simons theory
 Conformal field theory
 Fractional quantum Hall effect
 Local quantum physics
 Noncommutative geometry
 Quantum field theory
 Quantum triviality
 Topological quantum field theory

References

External links 
 .
 .
 .
 
 

Swiss physicists
1946 births
Living people
Members of Academia Europaea
Fellows of the American Mathematical Society
Theoretical physicists
ETH Zurich alumni
Academic staff of ETH Zurich
People from Schaffhausen
Foreign associates of the National Academy of Sciences
Winners of the Max Planck Medal
Swiss mathematicians